Roasted sweet potato is a popular winter street food in East Asia.

China, Hong Kong, and Taiwan 
In China, yellow-fleshed sweet potatoes are roasted in a large iron drum and sold as street food during winter. They are called kǎo-báishǔ ("roasted sweet potato") in northern China, haau faan syu in Cantonese speaking regions, and kǎo-dìguā ("roasted sweet potato") in Taiwan, as the name of sweet potatoes themselves vary across the sinophone world.

Korea 
Sweet potatoes roasted in drum cans, called gun-goguma ("roasted sweet potato"), are also popular in both North and South Korea. The food is sold from late autumn to winter by the vendors wearing ushanka, which is sometimes referred to as "roasted sweet potato vendor hat" or "roasted chestnut vendor hat". Although any type of goguma (sweet potato) can be roasted, softer, moist varieties such as hobak-goguma (pumpkin sweet potato) are preferred over firmer, floury varieties such as bam-goguma ("chestnut sweet potato") for roasting.

In South Korea, roasted sweet potatoes are dried to make gun-goguma-mallaengi, and frozen to make ice-gun-goguma.
Although gun-goguma has traditionally been a winter food, gun-goguma ice cream and gun-goguma smoothie are nowadays enjoyed in summer.

Japan 
In Japan, similar street food is called ishi yaki-imo ("roasted sweet potato in heat stones") and sold from trucks during the winter.

Northern Vietnam
Roasted sweet potatoes is also a popular street food in Hanoi and Northern Vietnam in winter.

Emoji
In 2010, an emoji was approved for Unicode 6.0  for "roasted sweet potato".

See also 
 List of sweet potato dishes
 Roasted chestnut

References 

Chinese cuisine
Japanese cuisine
Korean cuisine
Street food in China
Street food in South Korea
Sweet potatoes